Vernia verna, the little glassywing, is a species of butterfly of the family Hesperiidae. It is found in the eastern United States and southeastern Canada, from central New England west to central Nebraska, south to northern Florida, the Gulf Coast and southern Texas.

The wingspan is 27–39 mm. Adults preferably feed on the nectar of white, pink and purple flowers, including Apocynum, Prunella, Mentha × piperita, Eutrochium and Asclepias.

The larvae feed on Tridens flavus.

Subspecies
Vernia verna verna
Vernia verna sequoyah (Freeman, 1942)

References

Butterflies described in 1862
Hesperiinae